Conham is a suburb of the city of Bristol in England.  It lies near Hanham on the north bank of the River Avon just outside the city boundaries in South Gloucestershire.

The Conham Ferry is a small passenger ferry which operates across the river from Conham to Broomhill.

The Conham River Park lies in a loop of the River Avon, and forms part of the Avon Valley Woodlands.

References

External links
Conham at Streetmap.co.uk

Villages in South Gloucestershire District
Areas of Bristol